Alison Pick (born 1975) is a Canadian writer. She is most noted for her Booker Prize-nominated novel Far to Go, and was a winner of the Bronwen Wallace Memorial Award for most promising writer in Canada under 35.

Life and career
Alison Pick is the author of three novels (The Sweet Edge, Far to Go, and Strangers With the Same Dream), two poetry collections and one memoir (Between Gods). She was born in Toronto, Ontario and grew up in Kitchener. In 1999, she graduated from the University of Guelph with a B.A. in psychology. Pick received her MA in Philosophy from Memorial University in Newfoundland. During her teenage years, Pick discovered that her father's Czech family was originally Jewish although he had been raised a Christian. Pick herself later converted to Judaism.

Pick's novel Far to Go won the Canadian Jewish Book Award and was nominated for the 2011 Man Booker Prize. The novel has been optioned for film by House of Films, with a screenplay written by Hannah Moscovitch and Rosa Laborde.

Pick is the author of Between Gods, a memoir about depression, family secrets, and forging a new identity from the ashes of the past. It won the Canadian Jewish Book Award for Memoir, and was shortlisted for the BC National Award for Canadian Non-Fiction and for the Wingate Prize in the UK. Between Gods was also a Top Book of 2014 at the CBC and The Globe and Mail.

The title section of Pick's poetry collection Question & Answer won the 2002 Bronwen Wallace Memorial Award for Poetry and the 2003 National Magazine Award for Poetry. The book itself was short-listed for the League of Canadian Poets Gerald Lampert Award for best first book of poetry, and for a Newfoundland and Labrador Book Award. Pick also won the 2005 CBC Literary Award for Poetry. Her writing has appeared widely in publications including The Globe and Mail,The Walrus, and enRoute Magazine.

Pick served on the jury for the 2015 Scotiabank Giller Prize. Pick taught at the Iceland Writers Retreat in Reykjavík, Iceland in the spring of 2015. She is currently a member of the faculty at the Humber School for Writers and the Sage Hill Writing Experience. She lives and writes in Toronto.

Awards
2001 – Shortlist: CBC Literary Awards (Fiction)
2002 – Bronwen Wallace Memorial Award for Poetry (for the title section of Question & Answer)
2002 – Shortlist: League of Canadian Poets Gerald Lampert Award (for Question & Answer)
2002 – Shortlist: Newfoundland and Labrador Book Award (for Question & Answer)
2002 – Winner: Writer's Federation of New Brunswick's Alfred G. Bailey Manuscript Prize
2003 – National Magazine (Gold) Award for Poetry
2003 – Shortlist: CBC Literary Awards (Fiction)
2005 – CBC Literary Award for Poetry (for "The Mind's Eye")
2006 – Editor's Choice': Arc Poem of the Year Contest
2007 – Finalist: National Magazine Award for Poetry
2008 – The Globe and Mail Top 100 Book (for The Sweet Edge)
2010 – Winner: Words Worthy Award for Best Novel
2011 – Helen and Stan Vine Canadian Jewish Book Award, fiction category (for Far to Go)
2011 – Longlist: The Man Booker Prize for Fiction (for Far to Go)
2013 – Winner: Governor General's Award for Translation (Quebec edition)
2014 – Shortlist: Ontario Arts Council KM Hunter Award for Mid-Career Artist
2015 – Winner: Canadian Jewish Book Award for Non-Fiction and Memoir
2015 – Shortlisted: BC Award for Canadian Non-Fiction
2016 – Longlisted: JQ Wingate Prize
2016 – Shortlisted: JQ Wingate Prize

Festivals
 Sunshine Coast Festival of the Written Arts – 2015
 IFOA (Toronto) – 2014, 2011, 2010, 2005
 Wordfest: Calgary and Banff – 2014, 2010, 2003
 Vancouver International Writers Festival – 2014, 2003
 Ottawa International Writers Festival – 2014, 2010, 2008, 2005
 Thin Air: Winnipeg International Writers Festival – 2014, 2003
 The Bookworm International Literary Festival (Beijing, China) – 2012
 Jewish Book Week (London, England) – 2012
 BookFest Windsor – 2012
 Festival of Words (Moose Jaw) – 2012
 Prince Edward County Authors Festival – 2012
 Talking Fresh (Regina) – 2012
 Vancouver Jewish Book Festival – 2011
 San Diego Jewish Book Fair – 2011
 Tarbut: Festival of Jewish Culture (Winnipeg) – 2011
 Eden Mills Writers Festival – 2015, 2011, 2003
 Joe Burke Wolfe Island Literary Festival – 2011
 Elora Writers Festival – 2011
 GritLit (Hamilton) – 2011
 Ontario Writers Conference – 2011
 Kingston WritersFest – 2010
 Měsíc autorského čtení" (The Month Of Authors' Readings) (Brno, Czech Republic) – 2008

Juries
 The Giller Prize – 2015
 The Rogers Writers Trust Fiction Prize – 2013
 CBC Literary Awards – 2011
 The Journey Prize – 2011
 Lampman-Scott Award (Best Book by an Ottawa Poet) – 2008
 Malahat Review Novella Contest – 2008
 Gerald Lampert Award for Best First Book of Poetry –  2007
 Newfoundland Book Awards, Poetry Category – 2007
 Bronwen Wallace Memorial Award for Poetry – 2006
 Gregory Power Awards for Poetry, Memorial University –  2006
 Arts and Letters Awards, Newfoundland Arts Council,  Poetry – 2005
 Canada Council for the Arts, Poetry, Mid-Career and  Established – 2004

Anthologies
 The M Word: Conversations about Motherhood (Kerry Clare, ed) – Goose Lane, 2014
 Best Canadian Poetry in English 2008 – Tightrope Books, 2008
 The Mind's Eye: CBC Literary Award Winners 2001–2006 – ECW, 2008
 The Echoing Years: An Anthology of Poetry from Canada  & Ireland – WIT/SCOP, 2007
 Outside of Ordinary: Women's Travel Stories – Second Story Press, 2005
 Breathing Fire 2: Canada's New Poets – Nightwood Editions, 2004
 Vintage 2000: The League of Canadian Poets – Quarry Press, 2000

Radio appearances
 CBC Radio 'Tapestry,' host Mary Hynes – 2014
 CBC Radio 'The Next Chapter,' host Shelagh Rogers – 2010
 CBC Radio 'Weekend Arts Magazine,' host Angela Antle – 2010
 CBC Radio 'Sounds Like Canada,' host Shelagh Rogers – 2006, 2003
 CBC Radio 'Talking Books,' host Ian Brown – 2006
 CBC Radio 'Between the Covers,' host Eleanor Wachtel – 2006
 CBC Radio 'The Arts Tonight,' host Nora Young – 2006

Bibliography

Novels
The Sweet Edge – 2005
 Far to Go – 2010
 Strangers with the Same Dream - 2017

Poetry
Question & Answer – 2003
The Dream World – 2008

Non-fiction memoir
Between Gods: A Memoir – 2014

References

External links

 
 Audio of Alison Pick on CBC Radio's The Next Chapter

1975 births
Living people
Canadian women poets
Canadian women novelists
Converts to Judaism
Jewish Canadian writers
Writers from Kitchener, Ontario
Writers from Toronto
21st-century Canadian novelists
21st-century Canadian poets
21st-century Canadian women writers